Mohammed Saleh Suleiman (Arabic:محمد صالح سليمان) (born 15 July 1998) is an Emirati footballer who plays as a midfielder for Ajman.

Career
Mohammed Saleh started his career at Ajman and is a product of the Ajman's youth system. On 23 September 2017, Mohammed Saleh made his professional debut for Ajman against Shabab Al-Ahli in the Pro League, replacing Hussain Abdulrahman.

External links

References

1998 births
Living people
Emirati footballers
Ajman Club players
UAE Pro League players
Association football midfielders
Place of birth missing (living people)